GlySens, a biomedical technology company, is a privately owned corporation developing a long term internal continuous glucose monitor in order to effectively manage and observe glucose levels in real time. The GlySens ICGM system is the world's first surgically implanted continuous glucose monitoring system to demonstrate an 18-month performance in a preclinical setting. GlySens Incorporated was founded in 1998 by David A. Gough and Joseph Lucisano, a bioengineering graduate at the University of California, San Diego. The implanted continuous glucose monitoring system uses an internal sensor equipped with electrochemical detectors to measure glucose readings via a chemical reaction between enzymes and oxygen.

Technology
The technology that goes into the ICGM system consists of two parts. Primarily is the internal sensor which utilizes chemical reactions to determine blood glucose levels. Additionally, is an external receiver used to display glucose readings and patterns in real-time, hoping to help reduce the level of care needed in diabetics.

Internal sensor 
An internal glucose sensor, measuring at 38 mm across and 16 mm thick.  The implant consists of an integrated glucose sensor with signal conditioning circuits, a wireless communications circuit, and a 1-year lifetime battery, all housed in a hermetically sealed (airtight) titanium housing. The sensor is surgically implanted under the skin, at the waist or upper arm, and continuously monitors the glucose levels in the subcutaneous (under the skin) tissue. Data is then relayed to the receiver via wireless telemetry, the automatic measurement and transmission of data by wire, radio, or other means from remote sources. The ICGM system claims to be as accurate as any other CGM device, however unlike similar products, the GlySens ICGM sensor works by detecting oxygen, allowing the system to be more stable in the interstitial fluid environment, the fluid surrounding tissue cells, than traditional CGMs. It has an outer membrane with electrochemical detectors primed with enzymes to interact with the oxygen. The extent of the enzyme reaction and the concentration of glucose can be calculated by measuring the amount of remaining oxygen from the enzyme reaction. It is ensured the sensors are working properly through multiple built-in checks. The sensor may also have applications for glucose monitoring in type 2 diabetes including caloric and activity management, and prevention of type 2 diabetes in susceptible individuals.

External receiver 

The monitor provides a digital readout and graphical display of the glucose levels, alerting the user to hypoglycemic and hyperglycemic glucose levels, trending patterns and a series of directional buttons to access settings, history and calibration. Calibrating the receiver and sensor is necessary in order to ensure accurate readings and is as simple as taking a transdermal blood sample and entering it into the receiver. Lucisano, GlySens Chief Technology Officer, announced that in a future iteration the receiver should be converted to a software application that can run on a cell phone.

Competition 

The two primary competitors of GlySens include: DexCom and Medtronic. These CGM's utilize thin wire sensors that must be inserted just under the surface of the skin and replaced at least once a week. These companies currently are turning their attention away from long-term implantable sensors, while concepts may still be in development, they aren't immediate priorities. This makes the GlySens ICGM sensor the first long-term implantable glucose sensor that will be available to the public.

Studies 

Science Translational Medicine reported success on long-term glucose monitoring with the sensor-telemetry system implanted in the tissues of pigs. Monitoring was carried out while the pigs were initially non-diabetic and continued for 6 months after the pigs had been made diabetic by administration of a laboratory drug. The long-term animal results reported by David Gough provide a foundation for human trials, which began in January 2015 and are expected to conclude in early 2016. The first round of human trials includes a group of 20 individuals, both male and female, from the age of 21 to 65 years old. Each subject was implanted with the GlySens ICGM monitor under the skin of the upper arm and monitored over the course of 18 months. The GlySens ICGM system is currently undergoing clinical evaluation, the initial human implant trials have been completed, and preparations for additional human trials are underway.

Market 

In 2014 worldwide, an estimated 382 million people had diabetes, and this number is expected to double by the year 2030. In the United States alone, nearly 29 million people have been diagnosed with diabetes, and an additional 79 million people are classified as pre-diabetic. The World Health Organization projects that diabetes will be the 7th leading cause of death in 2030.  The worldwide annual expenditure on home and self blood glucose monitoring products has been estimated at $7 to $10 billion, with half of the sales occurring in the U.S. The total economic impact of diabetes in the U.S. is estimated at $245 billion each year.

References 

Biotechnology companies of the United States